The Best and Worst of Tred Barta is a reality television series hosted by Tred Barta which began airing on the Outdoor Life Network on November 5, 2004.

External links

2004 American television series debuts
2000s American reality television series
2010s American reality television series
American sports television series
English-language television shows
2012 American television series endings